Gisleno Julián Medina Leites (29 October 1941 - 20 April 2020) was a Uruguayan football player and manager.

Career
Born in Montevideo, Medina began playing football as a central forward in local side C.A. Cerro's youth system. He broke into the first team when the struggling club turned to its youth players to avoid relegation.  Medina made four appearances for Uruguay at the 1963 Pan American Games.

In 1965, Medina and his younger brother, Orlando, joined Argentine second division side Club Atlético Colón. They helped the club win the Primera B title, achieving a historic promotion to the Primera División.

After enjoying success with Colón, Medina moved to Colombia where he joined Cúcuta Deportivo for the 1967–68 season. Soon after, he moved to Mexico, playing for Primera División sides Atlante F.C. and Atlético Zacatepec before being forced to retire after a medical team determined he only had one kidney.

After he retired from playing, Medina remained in Mexico where he would coach Deportivo Morelos.

In April 2020, Medina died in Cuernavaca, Mexico.

References

1941 births
2020 deaths
Footballers from Montevideo
Uruguayan footballers
Uruguayan football managers
C.A. Cerro players
Club Atlético Colón footballers
Cúcuta Deportivo footballers
Atlante F.C. footballers
Atlético Zacatepec footballers